Pratham Singh (born 31 August 1992) is an Indian cricketer. He made his List A debut for Railways in the 2016–17 Vijay Hazare Trophy on 26 February 2017. He made his first-class debut for Railways in the 2017–18 Ranji Trophy on 9 November 2017. He made his Twenty20 debut for Railways in the 2018–19 Syed Mushtaq Ali Trophy on 21 February 2019.

Pratham was born on 31st August 1992 and currently lives in Delhi. He obtained his Bachelor of Technology in Electronics and Communication from J.S.S. Academy of Technical Education in 2015. He got an admission in Indian School of Business, Hyderabad for post graduate program in 2022 which he deferred.

Pratham is a left-handed opening batsman and right-handed off spinner. In 2017, he made his debut in List A cricket and represented Railways in the 2016–17 Vijay Hazare Trophy. He scored 73 runs off 154 balls in his Ranji Trophy debut against Maharashtra. He was the 3rd highest run-scorer in India in the 2018–19 Syed Mushtaq Ali Trophy, with 438 runs in 10 innings averaging 54.75. 

He was the highest scorer for Railways in 2020–21 Vijay Hazare Trophy with a total of 299 runs with a highest of 127 against Karnataka averaging 74.75. Pratham set a record by scoring 4 consecutive fifties in the Syed Mushtaq Ali Trophy.

In 2017, Pratham was bought by Gujarat Lions in the 2017 IPL auction. In February 2022, he was bought by the Kolkata Knight Riders for INR 20 lakh in the auction for the 2022 Indian Premier League tournament.

References

External links 

 
 Pratham Singh at KKR

1992 births
Living people
Indian cricketers
Railways cricketers
Cricketers from Delhi